Kopi-O II (浓浓咖啡乌) is the sequel to popular series Kopi-O which aired in 1985. It debuted in July 2002 and consists of 30 episodes. Veteran actors such as Cai Ping Kai, Qian Zhigang, Xiang Yun and Huang Yiliang return from the original series while many younger artistes made their early television appearances.

Synopsis
The series chronicles the everyday lives of vendors and workers at the humble neighbourhood "kopitiam" (coffee shop), the heart of Singaporean life. People from all statuses and walks of life cross paths at the coffee shop.

Sixth Auntie lives with her eldest son Jianzhong and his wife but was later driven out by them. Her second son Jianyi is disabled so she moves in with her youngest son Jianren, who is a reformed former gangster. For protection, he conceals his identity by running a western food stall with his wife Yuyan at the neighbourhood coffee shop. He shares the coffee shop with several other vendors, each with their own stories and hidden secrets.

Cast
Lina Choy Peng Hoy as "Sixth Auntie" 六婶 (liu shen)
Bryan Chan as Shen Jianyi 沈健义
Chen Tianwen as Shen Jianren 沈健仁
Liu Qiulian as Wu Yuyan 吴玉燕, Jianren's wife
Richard Low as Chen Mingcai 陈明财, sells chicken rice
Tracer Wong as Wang Aizhen 王爱珍, Mingcai's wife
Li Yinzhu as Xiuzhu 秀珠, sells fish porridge and noodles
Zen Chong as Hong Fuxing 洪福星, Xiuzhu's grandson
Joey Ng as Pauline 林佩玲, Fuxing's girlfriend
Chin Chi Kang 钱治钢 as Hong Jintu 沈金土, Jinbao's father
Huang Yiliang as Wenjuan 文隽
Nick Shen as Hong Jinbao 洪金宝, Jintu's son
Yang Lina
Vivian Lai as Stella aka shuyun aka xiaoyun, Jinhua's daughter
Xiang Yun as Hong Jinhua 洪金花, Stella's mother
Liang Tian as Hong Tian 洪天, Fuxing's biological father
Le Yao as Randy 陈丽珊
John Wong Teck Yenn as Shui Lian 水莲
Ang Puay Heng

External links
Kopi-O II (English)

Singapore Chinese dramas